Piptatheropsis is a genus of plants in the grass family.

Piptatheropsis is a newly recognized genus, named in 2011, comprising species formerly considered members of Milium, Oryzopsis, Piptatherum, Stipa, and similar genera.

 Species
 Piptatheropsis canadensis (Poir.) Romasch., P.M.Peterson & Soreng - Canada (BC to LAB), northeastern United States (ME NH NY MI WI MN WV)
 Piptatheropsis exigua (Thurb.) Romasch., P.M.Peterson & Soreng - western North America (ABT BC CO ID MT OR WA WY CAL NV UT)
 Piptatheropsis micrantha (Trin. & Rupr.) Romasch., P.M.Peterson & Soreng - western North America (ABT BC MAN SAS CO ID MT WY ND NE OK SD AZ CAL NV UT NM TX)
 Piptatheropsis pungens (Torr. ex Spreng.) Romasch., P.M.Peterson & Soreng - Canada (BC to LAB plus NWT + YUK), United States (Northeast, Great Lakes, Black Hills of SD + WY, Rocky Mountains of CO +  NM)
 Piptatheropsis shoshoneana (Curto & Douglass M.Hend.) Romasch., P.M.Peterson & Soreng - Idaho, Nevada

References

Pooideae
Poaceae genera